The FIBA Europe Women's Player of the Year Award was a yearly Player of the Year (POY) award that has been given out by FIBA's (the international governing body of the sport of basketball) European Division, to the best female basketball player with European citizenship. The inaugural award was given in the year 2005, and was awarded to Maria Stepanova of Russia; whom also won the most awards, having won the award three times. Playing in a FIBA tournament was not a requirement to be eligible to win the award.

The award was a calendar year by calendar year award, and was not a season by season award. The FIBA Europe Women's Player of the Year vote was decided upon by basketball experts and fan voting.

FIBA Europe Women's Players of the Year  
This was a calendar year by calendar year award, and not a season by season award, so all teams the player played with during the calendar year are listed.

Women's Players of the Year

See also 
 FIBA Europe Young Women's Player of the Year Award

References

External links 
FIBA Europe Women's Player of the Year Award at fibaeurope.com

FIBA Europe
European basketball awards
Awards established in 2005
Awards disestablished in 2014